Tjärnheden is a village situated in Forshaga Municipality, Värmland County, Sweden with 208 inhabitants in 2005.

References 

Populated places in Värmland County